= Pagetina =

Scientific classification
- Domain: Eukaryota
- Kingdom: Animalia
- Phylum: Arthropoda
- Class: Malacostraca
- Order: Amphipoda
- Family: Pagetinidae
- Genus: Pagetina; Barnard, 1931

Family of crustaceans

Pagetina is a genus of crustaceans belonging to the monotypic family Pagetinidae.

The species of this genus are found in southernmost Southern Hemisphere.

Species:

- Pagetina antarctica Andres, 1981
- Pagetina genarum Barnard, 1931
- Pagetina monodi (Nicholls, 1938)
- Pagetina reducta Holman & Watling, 1981
